The Orchid  Stakes is a Grade III American Thoroughbred horse race for fillies and mares that are four years or older held over a distance of one and one-half miles  on the turf usually scheduled annually in late March as an under card event on Florida Derby day at Gulfstream Park, Hallandale Beach, Florida. The event currently carries a purse of $150,000.

History

The inaugural running of the event was on 11 March 1954 as a six furlong dirt sprint for three year old fillies that was easily won by Queen Hopeful who was ridden by US Hall of Fame jockey John H. Adams and trained by US Hall of Fame trainer Harry E. Trotsek by a 3 lengths margin.

Gulfstream Park did not schedule the event again until 1965 after an absence of 10 years. In 1965 and 1966 the event was still held for three year old fillies but the distance was increased to  miles. In 1967 the event was held on the turf for the first time over a distance of one mile. The conditions of the event were changes to allow older mares compete under handicap conditions. In the first division Indian Sunlite set a track record for the mile in a time of 1:34.

In 1969 the distance of the event was increased to  miles.

In 1973 the first year the classification system was enacted, the event was set with Grade III status and in 1981 the event was upgraded to Grade II.

In 1986 the distance of the event was increased to  miles.

In 2006 the event was downgraded to a Grade III event. In 2008 the event's conditions were changed from handicap to stakes allowance with name of race changed back to the original name.

In 2016 the distance of the event of was decreased to  miles and in 2022 was increased back to  miles.

The event has been run in split division four times:  1967, 1972, 1983, 1985

Records
Speed record:
 miles – 2:11.73 Mean Mary (2020)
 miles – 2:23.07 Honey Ryder  (2005)  
 miles – 1:40.40  Just A Game (IRE) (1980) 
 1 mile – 1:34.60 Indian Sunlite (1967)

Margins:
 lengths – Tweedside (2003)

Most wins:
 2 – Honey Ryder (2005, 2006)

Most wins by a jockey:
 5 – John R. Velazquez (2005, 2006, 2008, 2011, 2015)

Most wins by a trainer:
 7 – Christophe Clement (1994, 1999, 2000, 2001, 2002, 2004, 2015)

Most wins by an owner:
 3 – Barbara Hunter (1970, 1974, 1979)
 3 – Glencrest Farm (1987, 2005, 2006)

Winners

Legend:

See also
List of American and Canadian Graded races

External links
 2020–21 Gulfstream Park Media Guide

References

Graded stakes races in the United States
Grade 3 stakes races in the United States
1954 establishments in Florida
Horse races in Florida
Long-distance horse races for fillies and mares
Gulfstream Park
Recurring sporting events established in 1954